Alice De Innocentiis (born 4 June 1984) is an Italian-born Australian female volleyball player. She is part of the Australian women's national volleyball team.

She participated at the 2016 FIVB Volleyball World Grand Prix, and 2017 FIVB Volleyball World Grand Prix and 2017 World Qualification Tournament.

References

1984 births
Living people
Australian women's volleyball players